Sheshghelan (Azerbaijani: Şeşgilan, also Sheshgelan) is one of the districts of Tabriz. Located  at the city center, it is one of the oldest quarters of the city and contains several historical buildings, including Qari Bridge, Amir Nezam House, Seyed Hamzeh shrine. Museum of Ostad Bohtouni and  Maqbaratoshoara are other points of interest in Sheshgelan.

Sheshgelan, along with Bagmesha, Sirkhab and Davachi, were among the districts of Tabriz that were against the constitutional revolution of Iran.

References 
 http://www.eachto.ir

External links 
 Virtual Museum of Historical Buildings of Tabriz (School of Architecture, Tabriz Islamic Art University).
 Iranian Student's Tourism & Traveling Agency, ISTTA. (English), (Persian)

Districts of Tabriz